Zanclognatha tarsipennalis, the fan-foot, is a species of litter moth of the family Erebidae. It is found in Europe and east across the Palearctic to Siberia, Amur, Ussuri, Japan, Taiwan, Korea and China.

Technical description and variation

Forewing narrower and greyer, less purple, than Polypogon lunalis Scopoli, 1763, sometimes with a yellowish flush; the inner and outer lines nearer together; the subterminal line simple, brown without any shade before, slightly concave outwards; the cell lunule obscurer; hindwing paler grey, the subterminal dark, strongly white-edged externally; the ab. bidentalis Hein. is paler grey, with a faint yellowish or rufous flush, the sub-terminal line of hindwing hardly angled. Larva dull grey; the dorsal line greyish black; tubercles black ringed with yellowish green; spiracles black; head black brown.

Biology
The moth flies from May to October depending on the location.

The larvae feed on fallen leaves of European beech, oak and Rubus.

References

External links

Herminia tarsipennalis on UKmoths
Herminia tarsipennalis on Lepiforum.de
Herminia tarsipennalis on Vlindernet.nl 

tarsipennalis
Moths described in 1835
Moths of Asia
Moths of Europe
Moths of Japan
Taxa named by Georg Friedrich Treitschke